Comcast Sports Southwest (CSS) was an American regional sports network that served Greater Houston, Texas. It was owned by the NBC Sports Group unit of NBCUniversal. The channel was launched on September 1, 2009 and had a similar format to Comcast/Charter Sports Southeast, which launched ten years earlier. Both networks shared the same logo and focused primarily on collegiate and high school sports.

The network showed live college football and basketball games, primarily from Conference USA, the Sun Belt Conference, and the Southeastern Conference. Several of the live football games feature the University of Houston and Rice University. CSS also had the rights to Houston's coaches show and encores of most games from both schools on Friday nights.

On Thursday nights during the fall months, Comcast Sports Southwest broadcast live high school football games. The network also produced its own version of Comcast SportsNet's signature program SportsNite.

The network was discontinued on October 1, 2012 when Comcast SportsNet Houston was launched.

See also

Root Sports Southwest - a Houston-based channel formerly known as Comcast SportsNet Houston until November 2014 that airs Houston Rockets and Houston Astros games.

External links

Southwest
Television channels and stations established in 2009
2009 establishments in Texas
Television channels and stations disestablished in 2012
2012 disestablishments in Texas
Defunct local cable stations in the United States
Defunct mass media in Texas